Frederick James (Fred) Hoyle (14 December 1918 – 11 February 1994) was the inaugural Archdeacon of Bolton.

He was educated at St John's College, Durham and after wartime service during World War II was ordained in 1949. He was Assistant Curate at St Paul, Withington then  Curate in charge at  St Martin, Wythenshawe from 1952 (Vicar from) 1960; on the Manchester Diocesan Pastoral Committee from 1965 to 1971; and then Vicar of Rochdale from 1971 until his Archdeacon's appointment.

References

1918 births
Alumni of St John's College, Durham
1994 deaths
Archdeacons of Bolton